The Pakistan Gymnastics Federation is the governing body of Gymnastics in the Pakistan.

Affiliations
The federation is affiliated with:

 International Federation of Gymnastics
 Asian Gymnastics Union 
 Pakistan Sports Board
 Pakistan Olympic Association

Affiliated Units 
 Punjab Gymnastics Association 
 Sindh Gymnastics Association
 Khyber Pakhtunkhwa Gymnastics Association
 Balochistan Gymnastics Association
 Capital Gymnastics Association (Islamabad)
 Pakistan Army
 Pakistan Airforce
 Pakistan Navy
 WAPDA
 Pakistan Railways
 Higher Education Commission

National Championship 
Gymnastics is regular event at biannual National Games. In addition following events are organized by gymnastic federation each year:
 National Gymnastic Championship
 Under 18 National Gymnastic Championship
 Under 14 National Gymnastic Championship
 National champions

References

External links
 Official Website

National members of the Asian Gymnastics Union
Sports governing bodies in Pakistan
Gymnastics in Pakistan